Johan Wingård (1738–1818) was a Swedish Lutheran bishop of the Diocese of Gothenburg of the Church of Sweden, as well as first holder of chair no. 6 of the Swedish Academy. He also served as member of the Riksdag of the Estates.

Biography 
Johan Wingård was born in 1738 in Bohuslän, Sweden, to Didrik Hansson Wingård and Inger Helena (née Quilldahl). His family included several clergy; his 4th great-grandfather was the Norwegian-Swedish Protestant reformer Gude Axelsen Giedde, and his nephew was the poet Johan Börjesson. Their issue included , Johanna Helena (married Wrangel af Sauss) and Carl Fredrik af Wingård, the latter the future Archbishop of the Church of Sweden.

Wingård studied at Hvitfeldtska gymnasiet and Uppsala University, from where he received a Doctor of Theology in 1779. He was ordained priest in Saint James's Church in Stockholm in 1766, appointed vicar in 1775, and bishop of the Diocese of Gothenburg in 1780. He served at the royal court of Queen Louisa Ulrika, whose funeral he also held in the Riddarholm Church.

Bishop Johan Wingård attended as member of the Estate of the Clergy at the Riksdag of the Estates in 1778, 1786, 1789, 1792 and 1800.

He was the first holder of chair No. 6 of the Swedish Academy, a member of the Swedish Order of Freemasons, and a fellow of the Royal Swedish Pro Patria Society.

Distinctions
 : Commander of the Order of the Polar Star (1789; Knight 1784)
 : Knight of the Order of Charles XIII
 : Chair no. 6 of the Swedish Academy

References 
 Berättelser ur Göteborgs Historia under Gustavianska tiden, Hugo Fröding, Wald. Zachrissons Boktryckeri, Göteborg 1922 s.136-141
 Nordisk Familjebok
Porträtt av biskopar i sin tid, professor Anders Jarlert, Göteborgs stiftshistoriska sällskap, Tre Böcker Förlag, Göteborg 1997  s. 48-49
 Vilhelm Fredrik Palmblad, Biographiskt Lexicon öfver namnkunnige svenska män: Wa - Win, [Volym 20], P. M. Lindhs förlag, Uppsala, 1852
Matrikel öfwer dem af Swea-Rikes ridderskap och adel, som från år 1794 till närwarande tid blifwit introducerade, samt adopterade, och i riddare-klassen flyttade, Carl Fredrik Rothlieb  & Johan Adam Rehbinder, Stockholm, 1807 s. 110f 

1738 births
1818 deaths
Bishops of Gothenburg
Uppsala University alumni
Academic staff of Uppsala University
Members of the Riksdag
Members of the Riksdag of the Estates
Commanders of the Order of the Polar Star
Knights of the Order of Charles XIII
Members of the Swedish Academy
People from Bohuslän
Swedish Freemasons